Parker Molloy (born April 24, 1986) is an American writer and blogger. Molloy was an editorial and news contributor to Advocate.com, focusing on transgender issues. She has also written for other publications, such as Media Matters for America.

Early life
Molloy grew up in Manhattan, Illinois. After graduating from Lincoln-Way Central High School in New Lenox in 2004, she attended Millikin University in Decatur, Illinois for three years before transferring to Columbia College Chicago where she graduated in 2009 in Arts, Entertainment, and Media Management. During college, Molloy was an editorial intern at Pitchfork Media.

Career
Molloy briefly worked for Chicago musician Andrew Bird before taking a job at a Chicago-based ad agency. In 2013, she came out to management and her co-workers as transgender.

Molloy launched parkthatcar.net in July 2012 as a way to document her ongoing transition. As time went on, the blog focused less on Molloy's personal transition, and more on transgender politics and current events.

In 2014, Thought Catalog released Molloy's ebook entitled My Transgender Coming Out Story.

Molloy has written for Rolling Stone, The Huffington Post, and Salon, and The Advocate. She has been a panelist for the National Lesbian and Gay Journalists Association annual national convention and her input as a transgender journalist has been sought after by the Washington Post, The Week, The Boston Globe, and Autostraddle.

Honors and awards
Molloy was included in the second annual Trans 100 list, recognizing the work of 100 transgender advocates in the United States, announced at the launch event, March 30, 2014 in Chicago. On June 26, 2014, Molloy was named to Windy City Times annual "30 Under 30" list, honoring "the best in LGBTQIA activism, business, culture, non-profit work and more," and honored at a reception at Chicago's Center on Halsted.

Molloy was nominated for a 2014 National Women's Political Caucus Exceptional Merit in Media Award for an essay she wrote in October 2013, titled, "I am a Transgender Woman, and This is What It's Like."

On November 5, 2014, Molloy was named as a finalist for the Los Angeles Press Club's National Arts and Entertainment Journalism Awards for her work discussing drag culture's use of language seen by her and former contestants on RuPaul's Drag Race to be transphobic.

Controversy
On March 2, 2014, Molloy was interviewed by Chicagoist, concerning Piers Morgan's interview with Janet Mock and the death of Anne Vanderbilt, allegedly resulting from an article posted on Grantland.

On March 18, 2014, Molloy wrote an article titled "RuPaul Stokes Anger with Use of Transphobic Slur" at The Advocate. The article and others discussing the use of the word tranny sparked a conversation about its use by RuPaul and others. Molloy was criticized by prominent transgender activists Calpernia Addams, Justin Vivian Bond, Andrea James, Our Lady J, as well as drag artists RuPaul and Alaska, a former contestant on RuPaul's Drag Race, who made a parody video depicting Molloy being shot in the head.

Molloy's position was supported by Logo TV, the network airing RuPaul's Drag Race, which apologized for the use of transphobic language and by GLAAD. Molloy was supported in an open letter, drafted by Zinnia Jones and signed by Sarah Brown, Fallon Fox, Christina Kahrl, and over 350 other transgender people, against what they perceived as personal attacks by Addams and James.

In August 2014 Molloy faced a backlash from members of the trans community after encouraging another transgender person to self-harm. Molloy apologized.

References

External links

Living people
Transfeminists
Transgender women
Transgender rights activists
1986 births
Columbia College Chicago alumni
Millikin University alumni
American bloggers
Writers from Chicago
LGBT people from Illinois
American transgender writers